Ferrokentbrooksite is a moderately rare mineral of the eudialyte group, with formula . The original formula was extended form to show the presence of cyclic silicate groups and presence of silicon at the M4 site, according to the nomenclature of eudialyte group. As suggested by its name, it is the (ferrous) iron analogue of kentbrooksite. When compared to the latter, it is also chlorine-dominant instead of being fluorine-dominant. The original (holotype) material is also relatively enriched in rare earth elements, including cerium and yttrium.

Occurrence and association
Ferrokentbrooksite was discovered in Mont Saint-Hilaire, Quebec, Canada - a site wealth in rare alkaline minerals. At the site ferrokentbrooksite coexists with aegirine, albite, ancylite-(Ce), calcite, catapleiite, fluorite, fluorapatite, gonnardite, microcline, natrolite, nepheline, rhodochrosite, and serandite.

Notes on chemistry
Beside fluorine, ferrokentbrooksite has admixtures of rare earth elements (including cerium, yttrium, lanthanum, neodymium and some gadolinium and samarium), potassium, strontium, and contains minor admixtures of titanium, hafnium, and tantalum.

Notes on structure
Iron in ferrokentbrooksite has coordination number 5.

References

Cyclosilicates
Sodium minerals
Calcium minerals
Iron minerals
Manganese minerals
Zirconium minerals
Niobium minerals
Trigonal minerals
Minerals in space group 160
Minerals described in 1999